Alcohol by volume (abbreviated as ABV, abv, or alc/vol) is a standard measure of how much alcohol (ethanol) is contained in a given volume of an alcoholic beverage (expressed as a volume percent). The ABV standard is used worldwide. The International Organization of Legal Metrology has tables of density of water–ethanol mixtures at different concentrations and temperatures.

In some countries, e.g. France, alcohol by volume is often referred to as degrees Gay-Lussac (after the French chemist Joseph Louis Gay-Lussac), although there is a slight difference since the Gay-Lussac convention uses the International Standard Atmosphere value for temperature, .

Volume change

Mixing two solutions of alcohol of different strengths usually causes a change in volume. Mixing pure water with a solution less than 24% by mass causes a slight increase in total volume, whereas the mixing of two solutions above 24% causes a decrease in volume. The phenomenon of volume changes due to mixing dissimilar solutions is called "partial molar volume". Water and ethanol are both polar solvents. When water is added to ethanol, the smaller water molecules are attracted to the ethanol's hydroxyl group, and each molecule alters the polarity field of the other. The attraction allows closer spacing between molecules than is usually found in non-polar mixtures.

Thus, ABV is not the same as volume fraction expressed as a percentage. Volume fraction, which is widely used in chemistry (commonly denoted as v/v), is defined as the volume of a particular component divided by the sum of all components in the mixture when they are measured separately. For example, to make 100 ml of 50% ABV ethanol solution, water would be added to 50 ml of ethanol to make up exactly 100 ml. Whereas to make a 50% v/v ethanol solution, 50 ml of ethanol and 50 ml of water could be mixed but the resulting volume of solution will measure less than 100 ml due to the change of volume on mixing, and will contain a higher concentration of ethanol. The difference is not large, with the maximum difference being less than 2.5%, and less than 0.5% difference for concentrations under 20%.

Threshold levels

Legal thresholds 

Some drinks have requirements of alcoholic content in order to be certified as a certain alcohol brand or label. Some alcoholic drinks may be considered legally as non-alcoholic in spite of having relatively high alcohol levels such as in Finland where products under 3 degrees can be sold legally as alcohol-free.

Low-alcohol beers (0.5<) are considered in some countries such as Iran as permitted (or "halal" under Muslim vocabulary) despite alcohol being banned. However, the level of alcohol-free beers is typically the lowest commercially sold 0.05.

Biological thresholds 
It is near impossible for a healthy person to become intoxicated drinking low-alcohol drinks. The low concentration severely limits the rate of intake, which is easily dispatched by human metabolism. Quickly drinking 1.5 L of 0.4% ABV beer in an hour resulted in a maximum of 0.0056% BAC in a study of German volunteers. Healthy human kidneys can only excrete 0.8–1.0 L of water per hour, making water intoxication likely to set in before any alcoholic intoxication.

The process of ethanol fermentation will slow down and eventually come to a halt as the alcohol produced becomes too concentrated for the yeast to tolerated, defining an upper limit of ABV for non-distilled alcoholic drinks. The typical tolerance for beer yeasts is at 8–12%, while wine yeasts typically range from 14–18%, with speciality ones reaching 20% ABV. Any higher would require distillation, producing liquor.

Typical levels 
Details about typical amounts of alcohol contained in various beverages can be found in the articles about them.

Practical estimation of alcohol content

During the production of wine and beer, yeast is added to a sugary solution. During fermentation, the yeasts consume the sugars and produce alcohol. The density of sugar in water is greater than the density of alcohol in water. A hydrometer is used to measure the change in specific gravity (SG) of the solution before and after fermentation. The volume of alcohol in the solution can then be estimated.  There are a number of empirical formulae which brewers and winemakers use to estimate the alcohol content of the liquor made.

Specific gravity is the density of a liquid relative to that of water, i.e., if the density of the liquid is 1.05 times that of water, it has a specific gravity of 1.05. In UK brewing usage, it is customary to regard the reference value for water to be 1000, so the specific gravity of the same example beer would be quoted as 1050. The formulas here assume that the former definition is used for specific gravity.

Wine 
The simplest method for wine has been described by English author C.J.J. Berry:

Beer

One calculation for beer is:

For higher ABV above 6% many brewers use this formula:

Other methods of specifying alcohol content

Alcohol proof 

Another way of specifying the amount of alcohol content is alcohol proof, which in the United States is twice the alcohol-by-volume (ABV) number. This may lead to confusion over similar products bought in varying regions that have different names on country-specific labels. For example, Stroh rum that is 80% ABV is advertised and labeled as Stroh 80 when sold in Europe, but is named Stroh 160 when sold in the United States.

In the United Kingdom, proof is 1.75 times the number (expressed as a percentage). For example, 40% ABV is 80 proof in the US and 70 proof in the UK. However, since 1980, alcohol proof in the UK has been replaced by ABV as a measure of alcohol content, avoiding confusion between the UK and US proof standards.

Alcohol by weight
In the United States and India, a few states regulate and tax alcoholic beverages according to alcohol by weight (ABW), expressed as a percentage of total mass. Some brewers print the ABW (rather than the ABV) on beer containers, particularly on low-point versions of popular domestic beer brands. The ABV value of a beverage is always higher than the ABW.

Because ABW measures the proportion of the drink's mass which is alcohol, while ABV is the proportion of the drink's volume which is alcohol, the two values are in the same proportion as the drink's density is with the density of alcohol. Therefore, one can use the following equation to convert between ABV and ABW:

At relatively low ABV, the alcohol percentage by weight is about 4/5 of the ABV (e.g., 3.2% ABW is about 4% ABV). However, because of the miscibility of alcohol and water, the conversion factor is not constant but rather depends upon the concentration of alcohol. At 0% and 100% ABV is equal to ABW, but at values in between ABV is always higher, up to ~13% higher around 60% ABV.

See also

Apparent molar property
Excess molar quantity
Standard drink
Unit of alcohol
Volume fraction

Notes

References

Bibliography

External links
 
 

Alcohol measurement